Ammonia is one of the most highly produced inorganic chemicals. There are numerous large-scale ammonia plants worldwide, producing a grand total of 144 million tonnes of nitrogen (equivalent to 175 million tonnes of ammonia) in 2016. This has increased to 235 million tonnes of ammonia in 2021. China produced 31.9% of the worldwide production, followed by Russia with 8.7%, India with 7.5%, and the United States with 7.1%. 80% or more of the ammonia produced is used for fertilizing agricultural crops. Ammonia is also used for the production of plastics, fibres, explosives, nitric acid (via the Ostwald process), and intermediates for dyes and pharmaceuticals.

History

Dry distillation
Before the start of World War I, most ammonia was obtained by the dry distillation of nitrogenous vegetable and animal products; by the reduction of nitrous acid and nitrites with hydrogen; and also by the decomposition of ammonium salts by alkaline hydroxides or by quicklime, the salt most generally used being the chloride (sal-ammoniac).

Frank–Caro process

Adolph Frank and Nikodem Caro found that Nitrogen could be fixed by using the same calcium carbide produced to make acetylene to form calcium-cyanamide, which could then be divided with water to form ammonia.
The method was developed between 1895 and 1899.
 CaO + 3C <=> CaC2 + CO
 CaC2 + N2 <=> CaCN2 + C
 CaCN2 + 3H2O <=> CaCO3 + 2NH3

Birkeland–Eyde process

While not strictly speaking a method of producing ammonia, nitrogen can be fixed by passing it (with oxygen) through an electric spark.

Nitrides
Heating metals such as magnesium in an atmosphere of pure nitrogen produces the nitride, which when combined with water produce the metal hydroxide and ammonia.

Modern ammonia production
Today, most ammonia is produced on a large scale by the Haber process with capacities of up to 3,300 tonnes per day. In this process, N2 and H2 gases are allowed to react at pressures of 200 bar. Ammonia is also processed by coal. The American Oil Co in the mid-1960s positioned a single-converter ammonia plant engineered by M. W. Kellogg at Texas City, Texas, with a capacity of 544 m.t./day. The single-train design concept was so thoroughgoing that it received the “Kirkpatrick Chemical Engineering Achievement Award” in 1967. The plant used a four-case centrifugal compressor to compress the syngas to a pressure of 152 bar, and final compression to an operating pressure of 324 bar occurred in a reciprocating compressor. Centrifugal compressors for the synthesis loop and refrigeration services were also implemented, which provided significant cost.

Almost every plant built between 1964 and 1992 had large single-train designs with synthesis gas manufacturing at 25–35 bar and ammonia synthesis at 150–200 bar. Another variation by Braun (now KBR) offered slight tempering to the plain design. The Braun Purifier process plants utilized a primary or tubular reformer with a low outlet temperature and high methane leakage to reduce the size and cost of the reformer. Excess air was added to the secondary reformer to reduce the methane content of the primary reformer exit stream to 1–2%. Excess nitrogen and other impurities were erased downstream of the methanator. Because the synthesis gas was essentially free of impurities, two axial-flow ammonia converters were used to attain a high ammonia conversion. In early 2000 Uhde developed a new process which enables plant capacities of 3300 mtpd and more. The key innovation of Uhde's dual-pressure process is a single-flow synthesis loop at medium pressure in series with a conventional high-pressure synthesis loop.

Modern ammonia-producing plants
A typical modern ammonia-producing plant first converts natural gas, liquified petroleum gas, or petroleum naphtha into gaseous hydrogen. The method for producing hydrogen from hydrocarbons is known as steam reforming. The hydrogen is then combined with nitrogen to produce ammonia via the Haber-Bosch process.

Starting with a natural gas feedstock, the different steps used in the process of producing hydrogen are the following:
 The first step in the process is to remove sulfur compounds from the feedstock because sulfur deactivates the catalysts used in subsequent steps. Sulfur removal requires catalytic hydrogenation to convert sulfur compounds in the feedstocks to gaseous hydrogen sulfide:
H2 + RSH → RH + H2S(gas)
 The gaseous hydrogen sulfide is then adsorbed and removed by passing it through beds of zinc oxide where it is converted to solid zinc sulfide:

H2S + ZnO → ZnS + H2O
 Catalytic steam reforming of the sulfur-free feedstock is then used to form hydrogen plus carbon monoxide:
CH4 + H2O → CO + 3 H2
 The next step then uses catalytic shift conversion to convert the carbon monoxide to carbon dioxide and more hydrogen:
CO + H2O → CO2 + H2
 The carbon dioxide is then removed either by absorption in aqueous ethanolamine solutions or by adsorption in pressure swing adsorbers (PSA) using proprietary solid adsorption media.
 The final step in producing the hydrogen is to use catalytic methanation to remove any small residual amounts of carbon monoxide or carbon dioxide from the hydrogen:
CO  + 3 H2 → CH4 + H2O
CO2 + 4 H2 → CH4 + 2 H2O

To produce the desired end-product ammonia, the hydrogen is then catalytically reacted with nitrogen (derived from process air) to form anhydrous liquid ammonia. This step is known as the ammonia synthesis loop (also referred to as the Haber-Bosch process):
3 H2 + N2 → 2 NH3

Due to the nature of the (typically multi-promoted magnetite) catalyst used in the ammonia synthesis reaction, only very low levels of oxygen-containing (especially CO, CO2 and H2O) compounds can be tolerated in the synthesis (hydrogen and nitrogen mixture) gas. Relatively pure nitrogen can be obtained by air separation, but additional oxygen removal may be required.

Because of relatively low single pass conversion rates (typically less than 20%), a large recycle stream is required. This can lead to the accumulation of inerts in the loop gas.

Pressure differentials
The steam reforming, shift conversion, carbon dioxide removal, and methanation steps each operate at absolute pressures of about 25 to 35 bar, and the ammonia synthesis loop operates at absolute pressures ranging from 60 to 180 bar depending upon the particular method used.

Sustainable ammonia production

Ammonia production depends on plentiful supplies of energy, predominantly natural gas. Due to ammonia's critical role in intensive agriculture and other processes, sustainable production is desirable. This is possible by using non-polluting methane pyrolysis or generating hydrogen by electrolysis of water (or steam) utilizing zero carbon electricity from renewable energy sources or nuclear power. In recent years thyssenkrupp Uhde Chlorine Engineers has expanded its annual production capacity for alkaline water electrolysis to 1 gigawatt of electrolyzer capacity.

This would be straightforward in a hydrogen economy by diverting some hydrogen production from fuel to feedstock use. For example, in 2002, Iceland produced 2,000 tons of hydrogen gas by electrolysis, using excess electricity production from its hydroelectric plants, primarily for the production of ammonia for fertilizer. The Vemork hydroelectric plant in Norway used its surplus electricity output to generate renewable nitric acid from 1911 to 1971, requiring 15 MWh/Ton of nitric acid. The same reaction is carried out by lightning, providing a natural source for converting atmospheric nitrogen to soluble nitrates. In practice, natural gas will remain the major source of hydrogen for ammonia production as long as it is the cheapest.

Waste water is often high in ammonia. Because discharging ammonia laden water into the environment, even in wastewater treatment plants, can cause problems, nitrification is often necessary to remove the ammonia. This may be a potentially sustainable source of ammonia in the future because of its abundance and the need to remove it from the water anyway. Alternatively, ammonia from waste water is sent into an ammonia electrolyzer (ammonia electrolysis) operating with renewable energy sources (Solar PV and Wind turbine) to produce hydrogen and clean treated water. Ammonia electrolysis may require much less thermodynamic energy than water electrolysis (only 0.06 V in alkaline media).

Another option for recovering ammonia from waste water is to use the mechanics of the ammonia-water thermal absorption cycle. Using this option, ammonia can be recovered either as a liquid or as ammonium hydroxide. The advantage of the former is that it is much easier to handle and transport, whereas the latter also has a commercial value when a concentration of 30 percent ammonium hydroxide in solution is produced.

Ammonia made from coal

Ammonia made from coal is a process mainly practised by China. China produced about 32.6% of the global production in 2014, while Russia, India, and the U.S. produced 8.1%, 7.6%, and 6.4%. Most of their ammonia came from coal. There are many gasifier designs, but most gasifiers are based on fluidized beds that operate above atmospheric pressure and have the ability to utilize different coal feeds.

Small-scale onsite plants
In April 2017, a company to implement a method of ammonia synthesis that could allow economic production at scales 1-2 orders of magnitude below than ordinary plants with utilizing electrochemical catalyst was established in Japan.
The company, Tsubame BHB, have implemented the synthesis process into a module, and aiming to be adopted in distributed locations close to ammonia users.

Byproducts and shortages due to shutdowns
One of the main industrial byproducts of ammonia production is CO2. In 2018, high oil prices resulted in an extended summer shutdown of European ammonia factories causing a commercial CO2 shortage, thus limiting production of carbonated drinks such as beer and fizzy soft drinks. This situation repeated in September 2021 due to a 250-400% increase in the wholesale price of natural gas over the course of the year.

See also
Ammonia
Amine gas treating
Haber process
Hydrogen economy
Methane pyrolysis

References

External links
Today's Hydrogen Production Industry
Energy Use and Energy Intensity of the U.S. Chemical Industry, Report LBNL-44314, Lawrence Berkeley National Laboratory (Scroll down to page 39 of 40 PDF pages for a list of the ammonia plants in the United States)
Ammonia: The Next Step includes a detailed process flow diagram.
Ammonia production process plant flow sheet in brief with three controls.

Ammonia
Chemical processes